Planinski Vrh is a settlement in the Sava Hills in the Municipality of Šentjur, eastern Slovenia. It lies northeast of Planina pri Sevnici. The settlement, and the entire municipality, are included in the Savinja Statistical Region, which is in the Slovenian portion of the historical Duchy of Styria.

Name
The name of the settlement was changed from Vrh to Planinski Vrh in 1953.

References

External links
Planinski Vrh at Geopedia

Populated places in the Municipality of Šentjur